The Pepsinae are a subfamily of the spider wasp family, Pompilidae, including the tarantula hawks, as well as smaller species.

Genera
Ageniella Banks, 1912
Allaporus Banks, 1933
Auplopus Spinola, 1841

Caliadurgus Pate, 1946
Chirodamus Haliday, 1837
Cryptocheilus Panzer, 1806
Cyemagenia Arnold, 1946
Cyphononyx Dahlbom, 1845
Deuteragenia Šustera, 1912
Dichragenia Haupt, 1950
Dipogon Fox 1897
Entypus Dahlbom, 1843
Epipompilus Kohl, 1884
Guichardia Arnold, 1951
Hemipepsis Dahlbom, 1844
Java Pate, 1946
Melanagenia Wahis, 2009
Minagenia Banks, 1934
Nipponodipogon Ishikawa, 1965
Paraclavelia Haupt, 1930
Pepsis Fabricius, 1804
Phanagenia Banks, 1933
Poecilagenia Haupt, 1926
Priocnemella Banks, 1925
Priocnemis Schiødte, 1837
Priocnessus Banks, 1925
Schistonyx Saussure, 1887 
Sphictostethus Kohl, 1884
Trachyglyptus Arnold, 1934 
Xenopepsis Arnold, 1932

References

 
Apocrita subfamilies